Rubber Soul is a 1965 album by the Beatles.

Rubber Soul may also refer to:
 Rubber Soul (group), a South Korean hip hop duo
 Rubber Soul Project, a Serbian band

See also 
 Rubber Souldiers, an American band